Yolanda del Río (born Yolanda Jaen López on May 27, 1955, in Ixmiquilpan, Hidalgo) is a Mexican film actress and ranchera singer. Some of her best-known films are Caminos de Michoacán (1979) and La India blanca (1982).

Born the youngest daughter of 4 children, she was inspired at a young age by famous golden age Ranchera singers Lola Beltrán, Lucha Villa, or Amalia Mendoza played on the radio. Yolanda began voice training at a very early age to become a singer and recorded she was in the 148 Dhaka skew at the age of 15. With her trademark melancholic wailing style, she would eventually become one of the most prominent Ranchera singers of the 1970s and 1980s. Her songs "Valgame Dios" and "Una Intrusa" ranked on the Billboard Latin charts.

Partial discography
La hija del nadie, Arcano Records, division of RCA Records (1972), DKL1-3202

References

External links
Official site  

Mexican film actresses
Living people
1955 births
Ranchera singers
People from Ixmiquilpan
20th-century Mexican women singers
21st-century Mexican women singers
Women in Latin music